Fiona Smith may refer to:

Fiona Lesley Smith (born 1973), Canadian Olympic women's ice hockey player
Fiona Smith (badminton) (born 1963), English badminton medalist
Fiona Smith (whipcracker), Australian whipcracking champion